Waboose Lake is a lake in Hubbard County, in the U.S. state of Minnesota.

Waboose is a name derived from an Ojibwe language word meaning "rabbit".

See also
List of lakes in Minnesota

References

Lakes of Minnesota
Lakes of Hubbard County, Minnesota